The Herbert Baxter Adams Prize is an annual book prize of the American Historical Association. It is awarded for "a distinguished first book by a young scholar in the field of European history", and is named in honor of Herbert Baxter Adams, who was from the faculty of Johns Hopkins University and one of the founders of the AHA.

Established in 1905, the prize was at first awarded biennially. There was a hiatus in awards from 1930 until 1938. Since 1971 it has been awarded annually. In 1986 eligibility for the prize was changed from "American citizens" to "citizens and permanent residents of the United States and Canada".

The prize is one of the most prestigious awards offered by the U.S. historical profession. Previous recipients include Henry Steele Commager, Gordon A. Craig, James S. Donnelly Jr., Arno Mayer and Joan Wallach Scott.

List of recipients 
Source: American Historical Association

2022- Dan-el Padilla Peralta, Divine Institutions: Religions and Community in the Middle Roman Republic
2021- Stefan J. Link, Forging Global Fordism: Nazi Germany, Soviet Russia, and the Contest over the Industrial Order
2020- Alexander Bevilacqua, The Republic of Arabic Letters: Islam and the European Enlightenment
2019- Mar Hicks, Programmed Inequality: How Britain Discarded Women Technologists and Lost Its Edge in Computing
2018- Hussein Fancy, The Mercenary Mediterranean: Sovereignty, Religion, and Violence in the Medieval Crown of Aragon
2017- Max Bergholz, Violence as a Generative Force: Identity, Nationalism, and Memory in a Balkan Community
2016- Vittoria Di Palma, Wasteland: A History
2015- Emily J. Levine, Dreamland of Humanists: Warburg, Cassirer, Panofsky, and the Hamburg School 
2014- Daniela Bleichmar, Visible Empire: Botanical Expeditions and Visual Culture in the Hispanic Enlightenment 
2013- Steven Barnes, Death and Redemption: The Gulag and the Shaping of Soviet Society 
2012- E. Natalie Rothman, Brokering Empire: Trans-Imperial Subjects Between Venice and Istanbul
2011- Anna Krylova, Soviet Women in Combat: A History of Violence in the Eastern Front
2010- Karl Appuhn, A Forest on the Sea: Environmental Expertise in Renaissance Venice
2009- Priya Satia, Spies in Arabia: The Great War and the Cultural Foundations of Britain's Covert Empire in the Middle East
2008- Carol Symes, A Common Stage: Theater and Public Life in Medieval Arras
2007- Francine Hirsch, Empire of Nations: Ethnographic Knowledge and the Making of the Soviet Union
2006- Stephanie Siegmund, The Medici State and the Ghetto of Florence: the Construction of an Early Modern Jewish Community
2005- Maureen Healy, Vienna and the Fall of the Habsburg Empire: Total War and Everyday Life in World War I
2004- Ethan H. Shagan, Popular Politics and the English Reformation
2003- Terry Martin, The Affirmative Action Empire: Nations and Nationalism in the Soviet Union, 1923-1939
2002- Florin Curta, The Making of the Slavs: History and Archaeology of the Lower Danube Region, ca. 500–700
2001- Malachi Haim Hacohen, Karl Popper, the Formative Years, 1902–1945: Politics and Philosophy in Interwar Vienna
2000- Daniel Lord Smail, Imaginary Cartographies: Possession and Identity in Late Medieval Marseille
1999- Gabrielle Hecht, The Radiance of France: Nuclear Power and National Identity after World War II
1998- David Nirenberg, Communities of Violence: Persecution of Minorities in the Middle Ages
1997- Pieter M. Judson, Exclusive Revolutionaries: Liberal Politics, Social Experience, and National Identity in the Austrian Empire, 1848–1914
1996- Mary C. Mansfield, The Humiliation of Sinners: Public Penance in Thirteenth-Century France
1995- James H. Johnson, Listening in Paris: a Cultural History
1994- John Martin, Venice's Hidden Enemies: Italian Heretics in a Renaissance City
1993- Charters Wynn, Workers, strikes, and pogroms : the Donbass-Dnepr Bend in late Imperial Russia, 1870–1905
1992- Suzanne Desan, Reclaiming the sacred : religious and popular politics in Revolutionary France
1991- Theodore Koditschek, Class Formation and Urban-Industrial Society: Bradford, 1750–1850
1990- Richard C. Hoffmann, Land, Liberties, and Lordship in a Late Medieval Countryside: Agrarian Structures and Change in the Duchy of Wroclaw
1989- Jan E. Goldstein, Console and Classify: the French Psychiatric Profession in the Nineteenth Century
1988- No award
1987- Peter Jelavich, Munich and Theatrical Modernism: Politics, Playwriting, and Performances, 1890–1914
1986- William Beik, Absolutism and Society in Seventeenth-Century France: State Power and Provincial Aristocracy in Languedoc
1985- Jonathan Sperber, Popular Catholicism in Nineteenth-Century Germany
1984- Robert C. Palmer, The County Courts of Medieval England: 1150–1350
1983- Roberta Thompson Manning, The Crisis of the Old Order in Russia: Gentry and Government
1982- Edward Muir, Civic Ritual in Renaissance Venice
1981- William H. Sewell Jr., Work and Revolution in France: the Language of the Old Regime to 1848
1980- William E. Kapelle, The Norman Conquest of the North: the Region and its Transformation, 1000–1135
1979- Kendall E. Bailes, Technology and Society under Lenin and Stalin: Origins of the Soviet Technical Intelligentsia, 1917-1941
1978- A. N. Galpern, The Religions of the People in Sixteenth-Century Champagne
1977- Charles S. Maier, Recasting Bourgeois Europe: Stabilization in France, Germany, and Italy in the Decade after World War I
1976- Frederick H. Russell, The Just War in the Middle Ages
1975- James S. Donnelly Jr., The Land and the People of Nineteenth-Century Cork: the Rural Economy and the Land Question
1974- Joan Wallach Scott, The glassworkers of Carmaux: French craftsmen and political action in a nineteenth-century city
1973- Martin Jay, The Dialectical Imagination: a History of the Frankfurt School and the Institute for Social Research, 1923–1950
1972- Richard Hellie, Enserfment and military change in Muscovy
1971- Edward E. Malefakis, Agrarian Reform and Peasant Revolution in Spain: Origins of the Civil War
1970- John P. McKay, Pioneers for Profit: Foreign Entrepreneurship and Russian Industrialization, 1885–1913
1968- Arno J. Mayer, Politics and Diplomacy of Peacemaking: Containment and Counterrevolution at Versailles, 1918–1919
1966- Gabriel Jackson, The Spanish Republic and the Civil War, 1931–1939
1964- Archibald S. Foord, His Majesty’s Opposition, 1714–1830
1962- Jerome Blum, Lord and Peasant in Russia from the Ninth to the Nineteenth Century
1960- Caroline Robbins, The eighteenth-century commonwealthman
1958- Arthur Wilson, Diderot : the testing years, 1713-1759
1956- Gordon Craig, The Politics of the Prussian Army, 1640–1945
1954- W. C. Richardson, Tudor Chamber Administration, 1485–1547
1952- Arthur J. May, The Habsburg Monarchy, 1867–1914
1950- Hans W. Gatzke, Germany’s drive to the west (Drang nach Westen) A study of Germany’s western war aims during the First World War
1948- Raymond de Roover, The Medici bank: its organization, management, operations, and decline
1946- A. W. Salomone, Italian Democracy in the Making
1944- R. H. Fisher, The Russian Fur Trade, 1550–1700
1942- E. Harris Harbison, Rival Ambassadors at the Court of Queen Mary
1940- John Shelton Curtiss, Church and State in Russia: the Last Years of the Empire, 1900–1917
1938- Arthur McCandless Wilson, French Foreign Policy During the Administration of Cardinal Fleury, 1726–1743
1937- No award
1935- No award
1933- No award
1931- Vernon J. Puryear, England, Russia, and the Straits Question
1929- Henry Steele Commager, Struensee and the Reform Movement in Denmark
1927- William F. Galpin, The British Grain Trade in the Napoleonic Period
1925- Frederick S. Rodkey, The Turko-Egyptian Question in the Relations of England, France, and Russia, 1832–1841
1922- John Thomas McNeill, History of the Oath Ex Officio in England by Mary Hume Maguire: The Celtic Penitentials and their Influence on Continental Christianity
1921- Elinar Joranson, The Danegeld in France
1919- William Thomas Morgan, English Political Parties and Leaders in the Reign of Queen Anne, 1702–1710
1917- Frederick L. Nussbaum, Commercial Policy in the French Revolution: a Study of the Career of G. J. A. Ducher
1915- Theodore Calvin Pease, The Leveller Movement: a Study in the History and Political Theory of the English Great Civil War
1913- Violet Barbour, Henry Bennet, Earl of Arlington, Secretary of State to Charles II
1911- Louise Fargo Brown, The Political Activities of the Baptists and Fifth Monarchy Men in England During the Interregnum
1909- Wallace Notestein, A History of Witchcraft in England from 1558 to 1718
1907- Two awards;
Edward B. Krehbiel, The Interdict, its History and its Operation, with Especial Attention to the Time of Pope Innocent III
William S. Robertson, Francisco de Miranda and the Revolutionizing of Spanish America
1905- David S. Muzzey, The Spiritual Franciscans

See also

 List of history awards

References 

American Historical Association book prizes
Early career awards
American history awards
American non-fiction literary awards
Awards established in 1905
1905 establishments in the United States